The Edmonton Rush are a lacrosse team based in Edmonton playing in the National Lacrosse League (NLL). The 2008 season was the 3rd in franchise history.

Regular season

Conference standings

Game log
Reference:

Player stats
Reference:

Runners (Top 10)

Note: GP = Games played; G = Goals; A = Assists; Pts = Points; LB = Loose balls; PIM = Penalty minutes

Goaltenders
Note: GP = Games played; MIN = Minutes; W = Wins; L = Losses; GA = Goals against; Sv% = Save percentage; GAA = Goals against average

Awards

Transactions

Trades

*Later traded to the Boston Blazers
**Later traded to the Chicago Shamrox
***Later traded to the Rochester Knighthawks
****Later traded to the Washington Stealth
*****Later traded to the Toronto Rock
******Later traded to the Philadelphia Wings
*******Later traded back to the Colorado Mammoth
********Later traded to the Calgary Roughnecks

Entry Draft
The 2007 NLL Entry Draft took place on September 1, 2007. The Rush made the following selections:

 Denotes player who never played in the NLL regular season or playoffs

Roster
Reference:

See also
2008 NLL season

References

Edmonton